NA-54 Rawalpindi-III is a constituency for the National Assembly of Pakistan.

Members of Parliament

2002–2018: NA-56 Rawalpindi-VII

2018-2023: NA-60 Rawalpindi-IV

Election 2002 

General elections were held on 10 Oct 2002. Sheikh Rasheed Ahmad an Independent candidate won by 30,951 votes. All candidates that achieved over 1,000 votes are listed here.

|}

Election 2008 

General elections were held on 18 Feb 2008. Muhammad Hanif Abbasi of PML-N won by 73,433 votes.

|}

Election 2013 

General elections were held on 11 May 2013 at 8 am. Imran Khan won this seat with 80,425 votes. All candidates receiving over 1,000 votes are listed here.

 
|}

Election 2018 

Elections were scheduled to be held in this constituency on 25 July as a part of the 2018 Pakistan general election. However, following the conviction of Pakistan Muslim League (N) candidate, Hanif Abbasi on 21 July, this election was postponed to an undisclosed date.

By-election 2018

By-elections were held in this constituency on 14 October 2018.

By-election 2023 
A by-election will be held on 16 March 2023 due to the resignation of Sheikh Rashid Shafique, the previous MNA from this seat.

See also
NA-53 Rawalpindi-II
NA-55 Rawalpindi-IV

References

External links 
Election result's official website
Delimitation 2018 official website Election Commission of Pakistan

60
60